The Sibrevcomovsky Bridge (Sibrevcomovsky Most) is a pedestrian bridge over the Ippodromskya Street, connecting the Tsentralny and Oktyabrsky districts of Novosibirsk, Russia. It was opened on November 7, 1926. Architect: M. A. Ulianinsky. Previously, it was a road bridge.

Initially, it crossed the Kamenka River, but then the river was enclosed in a tunnel.

Bridge name
The bridge is named after Sibrevcom Street.

History
The Sibrevcomovsky Bridge was constructed from May 1925 to November 1926.

Until the 1960s, it was a dangerous place. Frequent robberies occurred on the bridge.

In the 1980s, the bridge became a pedestrian walkway.

References

S
Tsentralny City District, Novosibirsk
Oktyabrsky District, Novosibirsk
Bridges completed in 1926